1st New Hampshire Infantry Regiment filled its ranks within two weeks of President Lincoln's call for 70,000 men on April 15, 1861.  Between April 17 and 30, 1861, not less than 2,004 men volunteered to fight for the Union in the American Civil War.  The volunteers organized and mustered at "Camp Union," the Fair Grounds of the Merrimack County Agricultural Society on the east side of the Merrimack River, in Concord between May 1 and May 7, 1861.  After the 1st NH was filled, volunteers were given their choice to enlist in the 2nd New Hampshire Volunteer Regiment or serve their three months as the garrison of Fort Constitution at Portsmouth Harbor. Four hundred and ninety-six (496) enlisted in the 2nd NH, and the remainder were sent to Fort Constitution.  

In early May 1861, Baldwin's Cornet Band, of Manchester, under the leadership of Edwin T. Baldwin, joined the regiment.  The law at the time made no provision for regimental bands, thus band members were not mustered in until vacancies occurred in companies, and where they became as privates or company musicians but continued their duty in the band.

The 1st NH was commanded by Colonel Mason Tappan and later assigned to General Patterson's Army of the Shenandoah.  In August 1861, the 1st NH was mustered out at the end of its three months.  The average age of the officers was 36 and enlisted men was 24.

See also

 1st New Hampshire Regiment (American Revolutionary War)
 197th Field Artillery Regiment (United States)
 List of New Hampshire Civil War Units

External links
A Brief History of the 172nd Field Artillery Regiment, the 197th Field Artillery Regiment and Separate Units of the NH Army National Guard (PDF)
First Regiment New Hampshire Volunteer Infantry - A Sketch

Further reading
 Waite, Otis F. R., New Hampshire in the Great Rebellion. Claremont, NH: Tracy, Chase & company, 1870.

1
1861 establishments in New Hampshire
Military units and formations established in 1861
Military units and formations disestablished in 1861